Labeo pierrei is a species of freshwater ray-finned fish in the genus Labeo native to the Mekong, Đồng Nai, and Chao Phraya basins in Cambodia, Thailand, and Vietnam.

References 

Fish of Thailand
pierrei
Fish described in 1880